Laura Gwendolen Douglas Galton Gascoigne CBE DStJ (2 March 1859 – 2 July 1949), was a British nurse, writer, and singer.

She was appointed Commander Order of the British Empire (CBE) in 1918. She was appointed Dame of Justice, most Venerable Order of the Hospital of St. John of Jerusalem.

Life 
Laura Gwendolen Gascoigne was the daughter of Sir Douglas Strutt Galton and Marianne Nicholson. Through her mother, Laura Gwendolen, she was the god daughter and second cousin to Florence Nightingale.

Marriage 
She wed Frederic Charles Trench Gascoigne on February 16, 1892. He was the nephew of Elizabeth Gascoigne, from whom he inherited Lotherton Hall, which the couple used as their family home. He was also the son of Colonel Fredrick Charles Trench and Mary-Isabella Oliver Gascoigne. Alvary Douglas Frederick Trench-Gascoigne, Cynthia Mary Trench-Gascoigne (later Hill), and Edward Oliver Trench-Gascoigne, who passed away as an infant, were their three children together.

Life at Lotherton 
In 1905, the couple inherited Parlington Hall and moved many of the furnishings from Parlington to Lotherton, making it their family home. Parlington Hall was demolished by the couple in 1950. They equipped Lotherton with central heating and electricity, restored the chapel and added a drawing room, dining room, entrance hall, and servant's wing.

In the 1930s, the Gascoignes had an elevator installed as Colonel Gascoigne was too old to get up and down the stairs. After he died in 1937, Laura Gwendolen Gascoigne used the elevator until one day it became jammed and she was stuck in it for several hours. After that she refused to use it and insisted on being carried up to bed.

First World War 
During the First World War Lotherton Hall was transformed into a Voluntary Aid Detachment hospital, catering to injured soldiers. Gascoigne was Commandant of the hospital and her daughter Cynthia was on the nursing staff. Cynthia was also in charge of the soldier's entertainment and organized card parties, concerts, and shoots on the estate. Due to her work in the war Laura Gwendolen was awarded a CBE in 1918. The following year she was also awarded the title of Lady of Grace of the Order of St. Johns Jerusalem.

Gardens 
Gascoigne had a keen interest in gardening. She used this knowledge and passion to redo the Lotherton gardens to her liking. Along with her gardening friends, William Goldring and Ellen Willmott, Gascoigne designed the Lotherton gardens to complement the rooms of the house. The gardens covered eight acres in front of the Hall and were a project she worked on between 1903 and 1949. The gardens are made up of walled roses, a rockery and a herbaceous borders.

Death 
After her death, Lotherton Hall was passed down to her son Sir Alvary Gascoigne.

References 

1859 births
1949 deaths
British nurses
British women singers
British women writers
Commanders of the Order of the British Empire
Dames of Justice of the Order of St John
Leeds Museums and Galleries Project